Saraswati Pratikshya is a writer known for her novel Nathiya published in 2018. Before writing the novel, she had published three poetry books: Yadhyapi Prashnaharu (collection of poems, 2005), Bimbaharuko Kathaghara (Ccollection of poems, 2009) and Bagi Sarangi (collection of poems, 2012).

Her novel Nathiya was about the Badi people. It was shortlisted for Madan Puraskar and won the Pachichan Puraskar (Identity Award) in 2019.

Personal life
Saraswati Pratikshya was born to a Thakali family. With her biological parents' consent, she was adopted by Nepalese writer Sarubhakta in 1998. She is divorced and lives with her son.

Bibliography 

Yadhyapi Prashnaharu (collection of poems, 2005)
Bimbaharuko Kathaghara (collection of poems, 2009)
Bagi Sarangi (collection of poems, 2012)
Nathiya (novel, 2018)

Prizes and honors 

Ganesh and Hastakumari Memorial Award, 2009 
Bhupi Memorial Award, 2011 
Gunzan Talent Award, 2012
Honor from Dhading Literary Society, 2006 
Samata Poetic Honor, 2009 
Janani Literary Award, 2018 
Lions Literary Award, 2019 
Pachichan Puraskar (Identity Award, 2019)

References

External links
 Saraswati Pratikshya Articles in eKantipur
 Interview Deshsanchar.com
 Television Interview

Living people
Date of birth missing (living people)
21st-century Nepalese women writers
Year of birth missing (living people)
Thakali people
People from Pokhara
21st-century Nepalese poets
Nepali-language writers from Nepal
Nepalese women poets